Confederate Memorial Park can mean:

Confederate Memorial Park (Albany, Georgia)
Confederate Memorial Park in Chilton County, Alabama
Confederate Memorial Park (Tampa, Florida)